American Christian musician Dante Bowe has released two studio albums, and twenty-six singles (including two promotional singles).

Studio albums

Singles

As lead artist

As featured artist

Promotional singles

As lead artist

As featured artist

Other charted songs

Other appearances

Notes

References

External links
  on AllMusic

Christian music discographies
Discographies of American artists